The women's heptathlon event at the 2015 Summer Universiade was held on 10–11 July.

Medalists

Results

100 metres hurdles
Wind:Heat 1: -0.7 m/s, Heat 2: +1.3 m/s

High jump

Shot put

200 metres
Wind:Heat 1: -0.5 m/s, Heat 2: -0.4 m/s

Long jump

Javelin throw

800 metres

Final standings

References

Heptathlon
2015 in women's athletics
2015